The Sun City Challenge is a golf tournament on the Sunshine Tour. It has been played annually since 2007.

From 2007 to 2011 it was called the Nashua Golf Challenge and was held at the Gary Player Country Club, although from 2007 to 2009 the second round was played at Lost City Golf Course. From 2012 to 2015 it was held at Lost City Golf Course, before returning to the Gary Player Country Club from 2016.

Winners

External links
Sunshine Tour's official site

Former Sunshine Tour events
Golf tournaments in South Africa
Recurring sporting events established in 2007
2007 establishments in South Africa